Cave of Forgotten Dreams is a 2010 3D documentary film by Werner Herzog about the Chauvet Cave in Southern France, which contains some of the oldest human-painted images yet discovered—some of them were crafted around 32,000 years ago. It consists of footage from inside the cave, as well as of the nearby Pont d'Arc natural bridge, alongside interviews with various scientists and historians. The film premiered on 13 September 2010 at the Toronto International Film Festival.

Production
Herzog's interest in Chauvet Cave, and the paintings inside, was prompted by an article in The New Yorker entitled "First Impressions" by Judith Thurman, who is credited as one of the co-producers of the film. To help preserve the artwork, access to the cave is restricted, and the general public is not allowed to enter, so Herzog had to get special permission from the French Minister of Culture to film inside. He was given approval for six shooting days of four hours each, with numerous restrictions. Everyone authorized to enter Chauvet Cave must wear special suits and fresh shoes that have not been worn outside, and, because of near-toxic levels of radon and carbon dioxide in the cave, nobody can stay inside for more than a few hours each day. Herzog was only allowed to bring a four-person crew into the cave, so he was just accompanied by cinematographer Peter Zeitlinger, a sound recordist (Eric Spitzer-Marlyn), and an assistant, and worked the lights himself. The crew was limited to battery-powered equipment they could carry into the cave themselves and lights that gave off no excess heat, had to stay on a  walkway, and could not touch any part of the cave's wall or floor.

The production encountered several technical difficulties in working with the 3-D cameras, which were custom-built for the production and often assembled inside the cave itself, in a documentary setting. At the time of production, 3-D films were typically shot on soundstages with heavy use of digital manipulation. Often, foreground and background elements would be shot separately and digitally composited into the finished shot. Techniques for 3-D filmmaking in natural environments with a single camera and no compositing were largely undeveloped, and had to be worked out experimentally by the crew in post-production.

Before filming Cave of Forgotten Dreams, Herzog was skeptical of the artistic value of 3-D filmmaking, and had only seen one 3-D film (James Cameron's 2009 film Avatar). The idea to use a 3-D camera for the film was first suggested by Zeitlinger, who felt, before ever entering the cave, that 3-D might be appropriate to capture the contours of the walls. Herzog initially dismissed the idea, believing 3-D to be (in Zeitlinger's words) "a gimmick of the commercial cinema", but, once he visited the cave, he decided the film had to be shot in 3-D to "capture the intentions of the painters", who incorporated the wall's subtle bulges and contours into their art. After finishing work on Cave, Herzog stated he had no plans to film in 3-D again.

Release
The film was finished at the last minute, with only 30 minutes of footage completed on the Wednesday before its debut at the Toronto International Film Festival on Monday, 13 September 2010. It was the first 3-D film to screen at the festival's Bell Lightbox theatre, and the digital projectors jammed five minutes from the end, interrupting the showing. When Herzog was asked why the French Ministry of Culture, who sponsored the film, did not require its premiere to be in France, he replied: "They didn't know it was finished."

Two days after the screening at TIFF, IFC Films announced it had secured the film's US distribution rights in a "mid-six-figure deal"; the television rights were already owned by the History Channel, who partially financed the film's production.

In January 2011, a trailer for the film was released that advertised a release date of Spring 2011. The film premiered in cinemas in the UK on 25 March 2011. Also in March, a second trailer, released for US distribution, announced a US release date of 29 April 2011.

Its opening weekend in the US, the film earned an average of $25,500 from each of the five screens on which it was shown in New York, Chicago, and Los Angeles; this was Herzog's best-ever per-theater opening, and the highest per-theater average of any film in the US that weekend. By 12 June 2011, the film had grossed $3.7 million in the US, making it the highest-grossing independently-released documentary of 2011 by a wide margin.

Reception
Critical reception to the film was positive. On review aggregator website Rotten Tomatoes, it has an approval rating of 96% based on 138 reviews, with an average score 0f 7.9 out of 10; the site's "critics consensus" states: "Hauntingly filmed and brimming with Herzog's infectious enthusiasm, Cave of Forgotten Dreams is a fascinating triumph." On Metacritic, the film has a weighted average score of 86 out of 100 based on 34 reviews, indicating "universal acclaim".

Awards and nominations

See also
List of Stone Age art
Art of the Upper Paleolithic

References

External links

Canadian documentary films
2010 films
Archaeology of France
Prehistoric art
Art of the Upper Paleolithic
History of Ardèche
French documentary films
German documentary films
British documentary films
2010 3D films
American documentary films
2010 documentary films
Documentary films about prehistoric life
Documentary films about the visual arts
Films shot in France
Films directed by Werner Herzog
3D documentary films
2010s English-language films
2010s American films
2010s Canadian films
2010s British films
2010s French films
2010s German films
English-language documentary films